Frenemies: Loyalty Turned Lethal is an American documentary series that started airing on Investigation Discovery on January 10, 2013. The show is about frenemy (a portmanteau of friend and enemy) relationships take a lethal turn.

2010s American documentary television series
Investigation Discovery original programming
2013 American television series debuts
2014 American television series endings